Silvia (born Silvia Renate Sommerlath; 23 December 1943) is Queen of Sweden as the wife of King Carl XVI Gustaf. She has held this title since her marriage to Carl Gustaf in 1976. The king and queen have three children: Crown Princess Victoria, Prince Carl Philip, and Princess Madeleine.

Childhood and parentage

Silvia Renate Sommerlath was born in Heidelberg, Germany, on 23 December 1943, the only daughter of Alice (née Soares de Toledo) and Walther Sommerlath. Her father was German and her mother was Brazilian.

She has one older brother: Ralf Sommerlath (born 1929). Her other brothers were Walther Sommerlath, who died in 2020, and Jörg Sommerlath, who died in 2006. The Mother-Child House Jörg Sommerlath in Berlin, operated by Queen Silvia's World Childhood Foundation, is named after her brother.

She attended high school in Düsseldorf, graduating in 1963; and attended the Munich School of Interpreting from 1965 to 1969, majoring in Spanish.

She has some fluency in Swedish Sign Language, a national sign language used by the deaf community in Sweden. She is a trained interpreter and Swedish is her sixth language. She speaks her native German, her mother's language of Portuguese, as well as French, Spanish, and English.

Marriage and family 

During the 1972 Summer Olympics, Silvia Sommerlath met Crown Prince Carl Gustaf. At the time, she was leading a marketing campaign for the city of Munich. Sommerlath and the other Olympic hostesses wore sky-blue dirndls to promote Bavarian cultural identity. After the death of King Gustaf VI Adolf on 15 September 1973, Carl XVI Gustaf succeeded to the throne.

He and Silvia announced their engagement on 12 March 1976 and were married three months later, on 19 June 1976 in Stockholm Cathedral ("Storkyrkan Cathedral") in Stockholm. It was the first marriage of a reigning Swedish monarch since 1797. The wedding was preceded, the evening before, by a Royal Variety Performance, where the Swedish musical group ABBA performed "Dancing Queen" for the very first time, as a tribute to Sweden's future queen.

The King and Queen of Sweden have three children and eight grandchildren:
Crown Princess Victoria, Duchess of Västergötland (born 14 July 1977), who is married to Daniel Westling and has two children
Prince Carl Philip, Duke of Värmland (born 13 May 1979), who is married to Sofia Hellqvist and has three children
Princess Madeleine, Duchess of Hälsingland and Gästrikland, (born 10 June 1982), who is married to Christopher O'Neill and has three children

In February 2021, Silvia was taken to hospital after she fractured her right wrist in a fall.

Father's Nazi links

In July 2002, the Queen became the subject of international curiosity when an article published in the syndicalist newspaper Arbetaren reported that German state archives record that the Queen's father, Walther Sommerlath, joined the Nazi party's foreign wing, the NSDAP/AO, in 1934, when he was living in Brazil and working for a German steel company. In December 2010, Queen Silvia wrote a letter of complaint to Jan Scherman, the CEO of TV4, the network that had aired a documentary about her father's alleged Nazi past.

Queen Silvia commissioned a report from World War II expert Erik Norberg, a choice that was criticized due to Norberg having ties to the royal family. In his report, Norberg argued that the Queen's father had in fact helped the owner of the steel-fabrication plant, a Jewish businessperson, escape from Germany by taking over the factory. In a December 2011 interview for Channel 1 with Sweden's public service broadcaster Sveriges Television, Silvia called the media's handling of the information about her father "character assassination".

Charity involvement

Queen Silvia established Mentor International in 1994 in collaboration with the World Health Organization. Her vision was to offer mentoring as inspiration, empowerment, and motivation for young people to make healthy life choices and view their futures more positively. Mentor's work has been recognized by the United Nations Office on Drugs & Crime, the Organization of American States, and the Council of Europe. She is now an honorary board member of Mentor Foundation.

She was also a co-founder of the World Childhood Foundation in 1999, having been inspired by her work as Patron of the first World Congress against Commercial Sexual Exploitation of Children held in Stockholm. She has also been involved in the Global Child Forum, which she helped initiate, as a keynote speaker in several forums.

Her commitment to the work with dementia and the care of the elderly at the end of life is also well known and respected. On her initiative, Silviahemmet was established in Stockholm. It works to educate hospital personnel in how to work with people suffering from dementia, and also initiates research in the area.

She chairs the Royal Wedding Fund, which supports research in sports and athletics for disabled young people and the Queen Silvia Jubilee Fund for research on children and disability.

Queen Silvia holds honorary positions in the Swedish Amateur Athletic Association, the Children's Cancer Foundation of Sweden and Save the Children Sweden.

Honours and arms

National

 :
 Member of the Royal Order of the Seraphim (LoK av KMO)
 Member of the Royal Family Decoration of King Carl XVI Gustaf, 1st Class
 Recipient of the 50th Birthday Badge Medal of King Carl XVI Gustaf
 Recipient of the Wedding Medal of Crown Princess Victoria to Daniel Westling
 Recipient of the Ruby Jubilee Badge Medal of King Carl XVI Gustaf
 Recipient of the 70th Birthday Badge Medal of King Carl XVI Gustaf

Foreign
 :
 Grand Cross of the Order of the Liberator General San Martín
 :
 Grand Star of the Decoration of Honour for Services to the Republic of Austria
 :
 Dame Grand Cross of the Order of Leopold I
 :
 Grand Cross of the Order of the Southern Cross
 :
 Member 1st Class of the Family Order of Laila Utama
 :
 Grand Cross of the Order of the Balkan Mountains
 :
 Grand Cross of the Order of Bernardo O'Higgins
 :
 Grand Cross of the Grand Order of Queen Jelena
 :
 Knight with Collar of the Order of the Elephant (3 September 1985)
 Recipient of the Silver Anniversary Medal of Queen Margrethe II and Prince Henrik
 :
 Member 1st Class of the Order of the Cross of Terra Mariana
 Member 1st Class of the Order of the White Star
 :
 Grand Cross with Collar of the Order of the White Rose
 :
 Grand Cross of the Order of the Legion of Honour
 Grand Cross of the Order of Merit
 :
 Grand Cross, Special Class of the Order of Merit of the Federal Republic of Germany
 :
 Member of the Decoration of Merit
 :
 Member of the Decoration of Merit
 :
 Grand Cross of the Order of Honour
 :
 Recipient of the Benemerenti Medal
 :
  Grand Cross of the Order of Merit of the Republic of Hungary
 :
 Grand Cross of the Order of the Falcon
 :
 Knight Grand Cross of the Order of Merit of the Italian Republic
 :
 Grand Cordon (Paulownia) of the Order of the Precious Crown
 :
 Grand Cordon of the Supreme Order of the Renaissance
 :
 Commander Grand Cross of the Order of the Three Stars
 Grand Cross of the Order of Cross of Recognition
 :
 Grand Cross of the Order of Vytautas the Great
 Grand Cross of the Order of Merit
 :
 Knight of the Order of the Gold Lion of the House of Nassau
 :
 Member of the Order of the Crown of the Realm
 :
 Grand Cross of the Order of the Aztec Eagle
 :
 Dame Grand Cross of the Order of the Lion of the Netherlands
 :
 Dame Grand Cross of the Order of St. Olav
 Recipient of the Silver Jubilee Medal of King Harald V
 :
 Knight of the Order of the White Eagle
 :
 Grand Cross of the Order of Christ
 Grand Cross of the Order of Infante Henry
 :
 Grand Cross of the Order of the Star of Romania
 :
 Member of the Decoration for Exceptional Merits
 :
 Grand Cross of the Order of Diplomatic Service Merit
 :
 Dame Grand Cross of the Order of Isabella the Catholic
 Dame Grand Cross of the Order of Charles III (16 November 2021)
 :
 Dame Grand Cordon with Collar of the Order of Chula Chom Klao (2003)
 The Boy Scout Citation Medal (2008)
 :
 Grand Cross of the Order of Merit
 :
 Grand Cross of the Yaroslav the Wise

Awards

 : Lady Grand Cross of the Social Order of the Amaranth
 : The National German Sustainability Award
 : Recipient of the Shaikha Fatima Bint Mubarak Motherhood and Childhood Award (November 2016)

References

External links

 Biography of Queen Silvia – Official website of the Swedish Royal Court
 Ancestry of Queen Silvia of Sweden
 World Childhood Foundation – Official site
 The Mentor Foundation International – Official site
 The Swedish Royal Family  – Information site with pictures, news etc.

1943 births
Living people
People from Heidelberg
Swedish queens
German emigrants to Sweden
German people of Brazilian descent
Swedish Lutherans
Naturalized citizens of Sweden
Swedish humanitarians

Grand Cordons of the Order of the Precious Crown
Grand Croix of the Légion d'honneur
Grand Crosses of the Order of Christ (Portugal)
Grand Crosses of the Order of Honour (Greece)
Grand Crosses of the Order of Prince Henry
Grand Crosses of the Order of the Liberator General San Martin
Grand Crosses of the Order of the Star of Romania
Grand Crosses of the Order of Vytautas the Great
Dames Grand Cross of the Order of Chula Chom Klao
Knights Grand Cross of the Order of the Falcon
Knights Grand Cross of the Order of Merit of the Italian Republic
Recipients of the Grand Star of the Decoration for Services to the Republic of Austria
Recipients of the Order of the Cross of Terra Mariana, 1st Class
Recipients of the Order of Prince Yaroslav the Wise, 1st class
Grand Crosses Special Class of the Order of Merit of the Federal Republic of Germany
Recipients of the Order of Merit of Baden-Württemberg
Recipients of the Order of the White Star, 1st Class
Recipients of the Benemerenti medal
Recipients of the Order of the White Eagle (Poland)